Timothy Patrick Harman is a former member of the Indiana House of Representatives representing District 17 from 2012 to 2016.  Harman is a Republican.  He is the founder and President of Harman Restaurants, Inc.

Education
 High School – Plymouth High School, 1985 graduate 
 Bachelor's Degree in Geography – Florida Atlantic University, 1992 
 Master's Degree in Education – Florida State University, 1994

Sources

http://ballotpedia.org/Timothy_Harman
http://votesmart.org/candidate/34010/timothy-harman#.VBS_8SwtCUk

Living people
Republican Party members of the Indiana House of Representatives
Year of birth missing (living people)
Place of birth missing (living people)
Florida Atlantic University alumni
Florida State University alumni
American restaurateurs
21st-century American politicians